Conan the Adventurer was a weekly one hour American television live action-adventure series. It was produced by Max A. Keller and Micheline Keller from 1997 to 1998 and was loosely based on the fantasy hero Conan the Barbarian.

The show premiered on September 22, 1997, and comprised 22 episodes, filmed mainly in Puerto Vallarta, Jalisco, Mexico. Keller Entertainment Group, the same production company responsible for the series Tarzan: The Epic Adventures and Acapulco H.E.A.T., continues to market and distribute the series worldwide. The role of Conan was played by Ralf Moeller, two time Mr. Universe, a native of Germany, and friend to Arnold Schwarzenegger. The rest of the ensemble cast included Danny Woodburn (Otli), Robert McRay (Zzeben), T. J. Storm (Bayu), Aly Dunne (Karella), and briefly, Andrew Craig (Vulkar).

The script for the pilot was written by Steve Hayes, the head of project development for the series. The storyline deviated from the essence of the Conan character, as well as that of the Conan earlier depicted in the 1980s films and comic book series by Marvel Comics, because this adaptation was more peaceful and aimed at all age groups.

Plot
An all-powerful sorcerer, Hissah Zuhl (Jeremy Kemp) rules Conan's homeland of Cimmeria with an iron fist through magical arts, trickery, and threats. He is responsible for the death of Conan's parents, and he is recurrent as the always just barely thwarted mastermind enemy. Conan and an army of warriors rebel and fight to free Cimmeria from the demonic tyrant and his minions. In his travels, Conan battles mythical creatures that roam the land. The hero has been chosen by the gods to fight evil, and he has been informed by Crom that he is destined to be a king.

Conan wants revenge against Hissah Zuhl (in all episodes the enemy has a primary role and also has a servant, a skeleton with clairvoyant powers), that seeks to kill the hero. The weapons that the sorcerer uses are an endless horde of warriors, as well as vassal wizards and princes under Zuhl's control.

Cast
 Ralf Moeller as Conan
 Danny Woodburn as Otli
 Robert McRay as Zzeben
 T. J. Storm as Bayu
 Aly Dunne as Karella
 Jeremy Kemp as Hissah Zul
 Arthur Burghardt as The Skull That Talks

Production

Episodes

Home media
On September 21, 2004, Image Entertainment released Conan the Adventurer: Complete Series on DVD in Region 1.

Soundtrack 
The soundtrack, Conan the Adventurer, was released by Sonic Images US on March 24, 1998 on Audio CD. The score was composed by Charles Fox. The song "In Love And War" with music by Charles Fox and lyrics by Roxanne Seeman was written for the tv series episode "Antidote". Michael Bradford, along with Roxanne Seeman and Charles Fox, produced a record version for the soundtrack.  Both versions feature Terry Reid singing and are included on the soundtrack.

Track listing 

Source:

See also

 Conan the Adventurer (1992 TV series)
 Conan and the Young Warriors

References

Bibliography
 Sammon, P. M., Conan the Phenomenon, Dark Horse Books, 2013.

External links 
 
 
 Director
 Barbariankeep

1997 American television series debuts
1998 American television series endings
American action adventure television series
American fantasy television series
Conan the Barbarian television series
First-run syndicated television programs in the United States
USA Network original programming
Fantasy television series